An incomplete list of schools in the province of Antwerp, Belgium.

A
Antwerp
Antwerp
Antwerp University
Antwerp International Business School
H. Pius X-Instituut 
Instituut Dames van het Christelijk Onderwijs 
Instituut Sint-Maria  
Instituut Sint-Lodewijk Sec. Handelsschool  
Jesode-Hatora
Koninklijk Atheneum Antwerpen  
Lucerna College 
Middenschool Atheneum Antwerpen  
Onze-Lieve-Vrouwecollege  (De Jezuïten)
PIVA 
avAnt Provinciaal Onderwijs (former Provinciaal Instituut Sint-Godelieve)  
Sint-Annacollege - Bovenbouw 
Sint-Annacollege - Middenschool  
Sint-Eligiusinstituut 
Sint-Jan Berchmanscollege 
Sint-Lievenscollege 
Sint-Ludgardisschool 
Sint-Norbertusinstituut
SITO 1
SITO 5
Stedelijk Instituut voor Handel en Ambachten 
Stedelijk Lyceum 
Stedelijke Middenschool 
Tachkemoni School
V.K.S.O. Maria Boodschapinstituut 
Van Celstinstituut
Yavne School
Berchem
Antwerpse Freinetschool
CDO Zuid Werkend Leren 
Instituut Fruithof
Instituut van de Heilige Familie
Koninklijk Atheneum Berchem 
Onze-Lieve-Vrouwinstituut - Pulhof
Sint-Stanislascollege
Sint-Willebrordcollege
Borgerhout
Xaveriuscollege
Mariagaarde Basisschool
Sint-Franciscusinstituut 
Deurne
Stedelijk Lyceum Deurne  
Ekeren
BSGO Driehoek
KA Ekeren 
Moretus Ekeren-->  fusion of O.-L.-V. van Lourdesinstituut and Sint-Lambertusinstituut   
Sint-Vincentschool
Vrije Basisschool Sint-Mariaburg   
Hoboken
Don Bosco Technisch Instituut  
Sint-Agnesinstituut
Merksem
Groenendaalcollege 
Katholiek Scholencentrum JOMA
Middenschool Merksem 
KA Merksem
Sint-Eduardusinstituut
Sint-Ludgardisschool 
Stella Marisinstituut
Technicum Noord-Antwerpen
Wilrijk
Sint-Ursula Instituut
Don Bosco: Centrum voor Deeltijds Onderwijs
Gesubsidieerde Vrije Basisschool De Ark 
Vrije Basischool
Stedelijke Basisschool

B
Berlaar
Heilig-Hart van Mariainstituut - Middenschool 
Instituut Heilig-Hart van Maria - Bovenbouw
Boechout
Sint-Gabriëlcollege
Boom
Koninklijk Atheneum Boom 
MSGO Den Brandt
Onze-Lieve-Vrouwinstituut 
Provinciale Technische Scholen
Bornem
Onze-Lieve-Vrouw-Presentatie - Middenschool  
Sint-Jozefinstituut
Brasschaat 
GIB Secundair Onderwijs 
Koninklijk Atheneum Brasschaat 
Mater Dei instituut
Sint-Michielscollege Brasschaat

E
Edegem
Onze Lieve Vrouw van Lourdescollege Edegem
Essen
College van het Eucharistisch Hart 
Sint-Jozefinstituut  
Sint-Jozefschool

G
Geel
Katholieke Hogeschool Kempen
Koninklijk Atheneum Geel
Sint-Jozefinstituut
Sint-Mariainstituut

H
Herentals
Sint-Jozefscollege Herentals
Sint-Jozefinstituut Herentals
Instituut van de Voorzienigheid
Francesco Paviljoen
Technisch Instituut Scheppers
Hove
Regina Pacis Hove

K
Kalmthout
Instituut Heilig Hart
Vrije Basisschool Sint-Jozef
Kapellen
Basisschool Irishof 
Koninklijk Atheneum Kapellen 
KTA 
Mater Salvatoris Instituut 
Maria Immaculata
Middenschool Irishof 
Virgo Maria-instituut
Kontich
Sint-Jozefinstituut
Sint-Ritacollege 
VTI Kontich

L
Lier
Atheneum Lier
Steinerschool Lier
Sint-Aloysiusinstituut
Sint-Gummaruscollege
Sint-Ursula
Steinerschool De Populier
VTI Lier

M
Malle
Oostmalle
Immaculata Instituut  
Maris Stella-Instituut
Middenschool Malle
Koninklijk Atheneum
Westmalle
Mariagaarde-Instituut
Sint-Jan Berchmanscollege
Mechelen
Berthoutinstituut-Klein Seminarie 
Coloma-Instituut 
Instituut van de Ursulinen
Royal Carillon School "Jef Denyn"
Koninklijk Atheneum Pitzemburg
KTA Wollemarkt 
Onze-Lieve-Vrouw van de Ham- Instituut  
Scheppersinstituut  
Sint-Romboutscollege
Mol
European School, Mol
KTA Mol
Middenschool Mol
Rozenberg S.O
Sint-Jan Berchmanscollege 
Sint-Lutgardisinstituut
Technisch Instituut Sint-Paulus
Mortsel
Anna-Theresia-instituut Middenschool
GTI Mortsel  
Koninklijk Atheneum Mortsel
Secundaire Handelsschool Sint-Aloisius

N
Niel
G.I.T.H.O. Afdeling Elektrotechnieken
Gemeentelijke Basisschool Niel
Sint-Calasanz-Instituut
Nijlen
Gemeentelijke Basisschool Nijlen

P
Puurs
BSGO Puurs
Buitengewoon Basisonderwijs Puurs
Sint-Jan Berchmansinstituut

S
Schoten
KA Schoten  
Sint-Cordula Instituut 
Sint-Jozefinstituut-Technische School 
Sint-Michielscollege Schoten 
Vita et Pax
Sint-Katelijne-Waver
Ursulinen-Hagelstein
Stabroek
Middenschool Stabroek

T
Turnhout
Heilig-Grafinstituut  
Hoger Inst.Verpl.St.-Elisabeth 
zennit turnhout 
KTA Molenhof Turnhout 
Sint-Jozefcollege 
Sint-Pietersinstituut 
Sint-Victorinstituut 
Stedelijke Handelsschool Turnhout
VTS Turnhout
ka boomgaard plein turnhout

V
Vorselaar
Kardinaal van Roey-Instituut

W
Westerlo
Vrije Sint-Lambertusscholen
Willebroek
Middenschool Willebroek H.
Koninklijk Atheneum Vaartland
Wuustwezel
Stella Matutina-Instituut

Z
Zandhoven
VTI Zandhoven

Buildings and structures in Antwerp Province
 
 
Antwerp